Gerard Russell may refer to:

 Gerard Russell (politician) (1620–1682), English politician
 Gerard Russell (diplomat), British diplomat and author